The Brussels International Film Festival (BRIFF) is a film festival that has taken place in the Belgian city of Brussels in September each year since 2018.

It has no relation to the previous Brussels International Film Festival (BRFF), which occurred between 1974 and 2016.

History
In its first edition in 2018, which took place in the Flagey building, BRIFF staged three competition categories: International, European and National. In 2019, the European competition was dropped and Directors' Week added.

Description
The event takes place in several cinemas around Brussels, and hosts several competitions, retrospectives, master-classes, youth activities, professional events, and programs of films around a specific theme.

The three competitions  are International Competition; Directors' Week; and National Competition.

Awards
The main award (best film) is known as the Grand Prix. The inaugural Grand Prix in 2018 was won by the Iranian film No Date, No Signature.

Locations
, the screenings and other events of the festival take place in the UGC De Brouckère, Palace, Galeries and Bozar cinemas, all in central Brussels.

References

External links

Film festivals in Belgium
Culture in Brussels
2018 establishments in Belgium
Film festivals established in 2018